The 2013 M&M Meat Shops Canadian Junior Curling Championships were held from January 31 to February 10 at the Suncor Community Leisure Centre at MacDonald Island Park and at the Oilsands Curling Club in Fort McMurray, Alberta. Alberta last hosted the junior championships in Calgary in 2011. The winners will represent Canada at the 2013 World Junior Curling Championships in Sochi, Russia.

Men

Round-robin standings
Final round-robin standings

Championship Pool Standings
Final Standings

Playoffs

Semifinal
Saturday, February 9, 10:30 am

Final
Saturday, February 9, 5:00 pm

Women

Round-robin standings
Final round-robin standings

Championship Pool Standings
Final Standings

Playoffs

Semifinal
Sunday, February 10, 10:30 am

Final
Sunday, February 10, 5:00 pm

Qualification

The Junior Provincials are being held January 2–7 at the Gander Curling Club in Gander

Results:

Men's semi-final: Boland 8, Sheppard 4
Men's final: Boland 7, Trickett 3
Women's final: Suley 5, Hill 3

The 2013 AMJ Campbell NS Junior Provincials were held December 27–31, 2012 at the Chester Curling Club in Chester, Nova Scotia. The event was a triple knock-out.

Results:

The Pepsi Provincial Junior Curling Championships are being held January 2–6 at the Cornwall Curling Club in Cornwall.

Results:

Men's tie breaker: Pitre 7, MacFadyen 5
Men's quarter finals: Smith 9, MacLean 8; Dixon 7, Pitre 6
Men's semi final: Smith 8, Dixon 4
Men's final: Smith 6, Gallant 2
Women's semi final: Smith 4, MacKay 3
Women's final: Smith 9, MacLean 5

The O'Leary Junior Provincial Championships are being held January 3–6 at the Bathurst Curling Club in Bathurst.

The event is a triple knock out.

Results:

The Quebec Provincial Junior Championships are being held Jan 3–8 at the Club de curling Etchemin in Saint-Romuald.

The event is a triple knock-out with a page playoff.

Results:

Men's Q1 vs. Q2: Asselin 8, Stewart 7
Men's Q3 vs. Q4: Bornais 11, Hall 3
Men's semi final: Bornais 8, Stewart 7
Men's final: Asselin 7, Bornais 4
Women's Q1 vs. Q2: Davies 7, Dumais 5
Women's Q3 vs. Q4: Guénard 10, Girard 7
Women's semi final: Dumais 8, Guénard 7
Women's final: Dumais 8, Davis 5

The Pepsi Ontario Junior Curling Championships were held January 2–6 at the Highland Country Club in London.

Results:

Men's semi final: Lewis 9, Krell 4
Men's final: Squires 9, Lewis 5
Women's tie breaker: Brandwood 7, Murphy 4
Women's semi final: Romain 5, Brandwood 4
Women's final: Sinclair 6, Romain 3

The Junior Provincials are being held January 3–6 at the Kapuskasing Curling Club in Kapuskasing (men's) and at the Soo Curlers Association in Sault Ste. Marie (women's).

Results:

Men's tie breaker: Warkentin 8, Dawson 7
Men's final: Warkentin 7, Byrd 6
Women's final: Keffer 7, Burns 4

The Canola Junior Provincial Championships are being held January 3–7 at the Brandon Curling Club in Brandon, Manitoba.

Results:

Men's B1 vs R1: Birchard 7, Doering 2
Men's B2 vs R2: Dunstone 9, Lott 7
Men's semi final: Dunstone 7, Doering 6
Men's final: Dunstone 8, Birchard 7
Women's B1 vs R1: Birchard 4, Peterson 3
Women's B2 vs R2: Kaatz 6, Watling 3
Women's semi final: Kaatz 7, Peterson 3
Women's final: Birchard 7, Kaatz 6

The Junior Provincial Championships were held January 3–7 at the Weyburn Curling Club in Weyburn

Results:

Men's A1 vs. B1: Scharback 10, Selke 7
Men's A2 vs. B2: Tenetuik 6, Vanderbuhs 3
Men's semi final: Tenetuik 5, Selke 3
Men's final: Scharback 9, Tenetuik 2
Women's tie breaker: Schneider 7, Williamson 4
Women's A1 vs. B1: Streifel 10, Hanson 5
Women's A2 vs. B2: Schneider 10, Michaluk 7
Women's semi final: Hanson 7, Schneider 6
Women's final: Hanson 9, Streifel 8

The Subway Junior Provincials was held January 9–13 at the Thistle Curling Club in Edmonton

Results:

Men's semi final: Roy 8, Vavrek 7
Men's final: Scoffin 5, Roy 4
Women's semi final: Flory 12, Theroux 2
Women's final: Flory 7, Rocque 3

The Tim Hortons Junior Provincial Championships are being held January 2–6 at the Coquitlam Curling Club in Coquitlam, British Columbia.

Results:

Men's semi final: Tardi 7, Habkirk 3
Men's final: Klymchuk 9, Tardi 4
Women's semi final: Brown 8, Jensen 3
Women's final: Brown 7, Van Osch 4

Territories
: Dec 21–23 at the Teslin Curling Club in Teslin
Winners:
Men: Mitchell Young (Whitehorse) defeated Christopher Nerysoo
Women: Sarah Koltun (Whitehorse) defeated Bailey Horte
:  The Junior Men's Provincial Playdowns were held January 3–6 at the Yellowknife Curling Club in Yellowknife

Results:

Women's winner: Carina McKay-Saturnino of Inuvik will represent the NWT in women's.
:
Winners:
Women: Sadie Pinksen (Iqaluit)
Men: David Kakuktinniq (Rankin Inlet)

References

External links
Home page

Junior Championships
Canadian Junior Curling Championships
Canadian Junior Curling Championships
Canadian Junior Curling Championships
Fort McMurray
Canadian Junior Curling Championships, 2013
Canadian Junior Curling Championships